Lieutenant-Colonel Sir David Semple (6 April 1856 – 7 January 1937) was a British Army officer who founded the Pasteur Institute at Kasauli in the Indian state of Himachal Pradesh. The institute later came to be known as the Central Research Institute (CRI).

Semple was born in Derry, the son of William Semple of Castlederg, County Tyrone. He was educated at Foyle College and earned his MD and MCh degrees at Queen's University Belfast, followed by his Public Health degree from Cambridge in 1892.

In 1911, he developed a nerve-tissue based rabies vaccine from the brains of sheep first made rabid and then killed. The 'Semple' vaccine however is known to have side-effects such as paralysis with high risk of other diseases, being just a crude form of churned brain-tissue. It needs administration around the stomach in a series of very painful injections administered over a period of seven to 14 days, a course that many do not complete. Moreover, it is not reliable and the World Health Organization (WHO) has been advocating its total disuse since 1993. (WHO literature )

He was given a knighthood in 1911, and is buried in City of Westminster Cemetery, Hanwell.

References

External links
Chiron Vaccines Rabies Information Site
Hanwell Cemetery
 

1856 births
1937 deaths
British immunologists
Royal Army Medical Corps officers
Recipients of the Kaisar-i-Hind Medal
Knights Bachelor